Mary Elizabeth Braddon (4 October 1835 – 4 February 1915) was an English popular novelist of the Victorian era. She is best known for her 1862 sensation novel Lady Audley's Secret, which has also been dramatised and filmed several times.

Biography
Born in Soho, London, Mary Elizabeth Braddon was privately educated. Her mother Fanny separated from her father Henry because of his infidelities in 1840, when Mary was five. When Mary was ten years old, her brother Edward Braddon left for India and later Australia, where he became Premier of Tasmania. Mary worked as an actress for three years, when she was befriended by Clara and Adelaide Biddle. They were only playing minor roles, but Braddon was able to support herself and her mother. Adelaide noted that Braddon's interest in acting waned as she took up writing novels.

Mary met John Maxwell (1824–1895), a publisher of periodicals, in April 1861 and moved in with him in 1861. However, Maxwell was already married to Mary Ann Crowley, with whom he had five children. While Maxwell and Braddon were living as husband and wife, Crowley was living with her family. On 1864, Maxwell tried to legitimize their relationship by telling the newspapers that they were legally married; "however, Richard Brinsley Knowles wrote to these papers, informing them that his sister-in-law and true wife of Maxwell was still living, thereby exposing Braddon's 'wife' status as a façade". Mary acted as stepmother to his children until 1874, when Maxwell's wife died and they were able to get married at St. Bride's Church in Fleet Street. Braddon had six children by him: Gerald, Fanny, Francis, William, Winifred Rosalie, and Edward Herry Harrington.

Her eldest daughter, Fanny Margaret Maxwell (1863–1955), married the naturalist Edmund Selous on 13 January 1886. In the 1920s, they were living in Wyke Castle, where Fanny founded a local branch of the Woman's Institute in 1923, of which she became the first president.

The second eldest son was the novelist William Babington Maxwell (1866–1939).

Braddon died on 4 February 1915 in Richmond (then in Surrey) and is interred in Richmond Cemetery. Her home had been Lichfield House in the centre of the town, which was replaced by a block of flats in 1936, Lichfield Court, now listed. She has a plaque in Richmond parish church, which calls her simply "Miss Braddon". A number of nearby streets are named after characters in her novels – her husband was a property developer in the area.

Work
Braddon was a prolific writer, producing more than 80 novels with inventive plots. The most famous is Lady Audley's Secret (1862), which won her recognition and a fortune as a bestseller. It has remained in print since its publication and been dramatised and filmed several times. R. D. Blackmore's anonymous sensation novel Clara Vaughan (1864) was wrongly attributed to her by some critics.

Braddon wrote several works of supernatural fiction, including the pact with the devil story Gerard or The World, the Flesh, and the Devil (1891), and the ghost stories "The Cold Embrace", "Eveline's Visitant" and "At Chrighton Abbey". From the 1930s onwards, these stories were often anthologised in collections such as Montague Summers's The Supernatural Omnibus (1931) and Fifty Years of Ghost Stories (1935). Braddon also wrote historical fiction. In High Places depicts the youth of Charles I. London Pride focuses on Charles II. Mohawks is set during the reign of Queen Anne. Ishmael is set at the time of Napoleon III's rise to power.

Braddon founded Belgravia magazine (1866), which presented readers with serialised sensation novels, poems, travel narratives and biographies, along with essays on fashion, history and science. It was accompanied by lavish illustrations and offered a source of literature at an affordable cost. She also edited Temple Bar magazine.

There is a critical essay on Braddon's work in Michael Sadleir's book Things Past (1944). In 2014 the Mary Elizabeth Braddon Association was founded to pay tribute to Braddon's life and work.

Partial list of fiction

Some bibliographical material in this incomplete list comes from Jarndyce booksellers' catalogue Women's Writers 1795–1927. Part I: A–F (Summer 2017).

Dramatisations
Several of Braddon's works have been dramatised, including:
Aurora Floyd, by Colin Henry Hazlewood, first performed at Britannia Theatre Saloon, London, 1863.
"The Cold Embrace", starring Jonathan Firth, BBC Radio 4, 2009.
Lady Audley's Secret, by Colin Henry Hazlewood, first performed at the Victoria Theatre, London, 1863.
Lady Audley's Secret, starring Theda Bara, Fox Film Corp., 1915.
Lady Audley's Secret, starring Neve McIntosh, Kenneth Cranham, and Steven Mackintosh, PBS Mystery! 2000.

References

Sources

Diamond, Michael. Victorian Sensation. London: Anthem (2003) , pp. 191–192

Pamela K Gilbert Mary Elizabeth Braddon (Oxford University Press, 2011) (bibliography)
Jessica Cox, ed. New Perspectives on Mary Elizabeth Braddon (Amsterdam, New York: Rodopi, 2012)
Marlene Tromp, Pamela K. Gilbert and Aeron Haynie, eds Beyond Sensation: Mary Elizabeth Braddon in Context (Albany: State University of New York Press, 2000)
Saverio Tomaiuolo In Lady Audley's Shadow: Mary Elizabeth Braddon and Victorian Literary Genres (Edinburgh University Press, 2010)

External links

Works at the Victorian Women Writers Project
Mary Elizabeth Braddon's The Higher Life audiobook with video at YouTube
Mary Elizabeth Braddon's The Higher Life audiobook at Libsyn

1835 births
1915 deaths
Writers from London
English people of Cornish descent
Victorian novelists
Victorian women writers
English women novelists
English horror writers
Women historical novelists
English historical novelists
Writers of historical fiction set in the early modern period
Writers of historical fiction set in the modern age
19th-century English women writers
20th-century English women writers
20th-century English writers
Women horror writers
Burials at Richmond Cemetery